The Gold Coast Art Prize is an annual acquisitive exhibition run by the Gold Coast City Art Gallery in the city of the Gold Coast, Queensland, Australia. One of Australia's oldest art prizes, it began in 1968 as the Gold Coast Art Prize but was known as the Conrad Jupiters Art Prize from 1990 to 2006 and as the Stan and Maureen Duke Gold Coast Prize from 2007 to 2011. It has since reverted to its original name.

Prizewinners

Gold Coast Art Prize
2014 Sonia Leber and David Chesworth for We are Printers too (video)  
2013 Darren Wardle for Head Case Study 7 
2012 Chris Bennie for The Western Fields (video)

Stan and Maureen Duke Gold Coast Art Prize
2011 Chris Langlois for Darkwood no. 19 2011 
2010 Joe Furlonger for Bridge to Bribie 
2009 Christopher Jones for the liver is the bucket kicked the rabbit 
2008 Bruce Reynolds
2007 James Guppy

Conrad Jupiters Art Prize
2006 Susan Buret
2005 Bernard Ollis 
2004 Marie Hagerty
2003 Juan Ford
2002
2001 Stephen Hart
2000 Megan Walch
1999 Barbie Kjar, Dean Bowen (sculpture)
1998
1997 Lorna Fencer Napurrula
1995 
1994 Guan Wel for The Great War of the Eggplants No 2

Gold Coast Art Prize
1977 Basil Hadley
1976
1975 Robert Dickerson
1972
1971 Jeff Makin
1970 Andrew Sibley
1969 Jon Molvig for Tree of Man X
1968 Michael Taylor for Overnight Sleeper
 John Coburn
 Lawrence Daws

References

External links

Australian art awards
Awards established in 1968
1968 establishments in Australia
Culture of Gold Coast, Queensland